Pierre Peugeot (1932-2002) was a French heir and business executive.

Early life
Pierre Peugeot was born in 1932.

Career
He served on the Board of Directors of Peugeot from 1978 to 1992. He then served as the Chairman of its Supervisory Board from 1992 to 2002.

Death
He died in 2002 in Paris. He was seventy years old. Upon his death, Prime Minister Jean-Pierre Raffarin released a statement to honor, "the memory of a prominent industrialist who played a determining part in turning a French family business into a global corporation, while being promoting the national interests and paving the way for the technological development of our country. His industrial daring and humanism set an example for us all."

References

1932 births
2002 deaths
Businesspeople from Paris
French corporate directors
Peugeot people
École Polytechnique alumni
Officiers of the Légion d'honneur